is a railway station in Midori-ku, Nagoya,  Aichi Prefecture, Japan, operated by Meitetsu.

Lines
Sakyōyama Station is served by the Meitetsu Nagoya Main Line and is 53.8 kilometers from the terminus of the line at Toyohashi Station.

Station layout
The station has two side platforms connected to the station building by a footbridge. The station has automated ticket machines, Manaca automated turnstiles and is unattended.

Platforms

Adjacent stations

Station history
Sakyōyama Station was opened on 5 November 1942.

Passenger statistics
In fiscal 2017, the station was used by an average of 2383 passengers daily. .

Surrounding area
 Midori-ku Ward Office
Japan National Route 1

See also
 List of Railway Stations in Japan

References

External links

 Official web page 

Railway stations in Japan opened in 1942
Railway stations in Aichi Prefecture
Stations of Nagoya Railroad
Railway stations in Nagoya